Slusher Nunatak is a nunatak lying 5 nautical miles (9 km) north of Mount Moses in the Hudson Mountains. Mapped from air photos taken by U.S. Navy Operation Highjump, 1946–47. Named by Advisory Committee on Antarctic Names (US-ACAN) for Harold E. Slusher, meteorologist at Byrd Station, 1967.

Hudson Mountains
Nunataks of Ellsworth Land
Volcanoes of Ellsworth Land